Jorunn Kjellsby (born 7 April 1944) is a Norwegian actress. She has worked both for Trøndelag Teater (1961–1963), Oslo Nye Teater (1968–1970) and Det Norske Teateret (1971–). She has also had almost 30 movies, such as Bryllupsfesten (1989) and Den som frykter ulven (2004). In 2006 she was awarded an honorary Amanda Award.

Select filmography
 Skulle det dukke opp flere lik er det bare å ringe (1970)
 Lasse & Geir (1976)
 Operasjon Cobra (1978)
 Life and Death (1980)
 Hotel St. Pauli (1988)
 Bryllupsfesten (1989)
 Lakki (1992)
 Høyere enn himmelen (1993)
 Amatørene (2001)
 Den som frykter ulven (2004)
 Rovdyr (2008)
 A Somewhat Gentle Man (2010)

References

External links

1944 births
Living people
Norwegian film actresses
Norwegian stage actresses